Roger Anthony Joseph (born 24 December 1965) is an English former professional footballer who played as a right back, best remembered for his time in the Football League with Wimbledon and Brentford. He won two caps for England B at international level.

Club career

Brentford 
Joseph began his career alongside his older brother Francis at Third Division club Brentford and rejoined the club in October 1984, after having been released as a junior and then playing non-League football for Southall. He made his senior debut on the final day of the 1984–85 season in a 1–1 draw with Millwall and attempted to establish himself as the club's first choice right back during the 1985–86 and 1986–87 seasons, before excelling in 1987–88 and winning Brentford's Players' Player of the Year award. His performances also saw him voted into the Third Division PFA Team of the Year and he became the first Brentford player to receive the accolade. He departed Griffin Park for a club record £150,000 fee in August 1988, having made 122 appearances and scored two goals for the Bees.

Wimbledon 
Joseph signed for First Division club and reigning FA Cup holders Wimbledon in August 1988 for a £150,000 fee. He began his time with the Dons as a regular but drifted out of contention by the 1993–94 season, making just 13 league appearances, before managing just three appearances in the following season (ending the season on loan at First Division club Millwall) and remaining absent for the entirety of 1995–96. Joseph was released in May 1996 after making 199 appearances without scoring.

Later career 
Joseph had a spell with Premier League club Chelsea during the early months of the 1996–97 season and made five appearances for the club's reserve team. He joined Third Division club Leyton Orient on a non-contract basis on 22 November 1996 and made 14 appearances before joined First Division club West Bromwich Albion on non-contract terms on 28 February 1997. He made just two substitute appearances in March 1997, before departing the club at the end of the 1996–97 season.

Joseph returned to Leyton Orient on 3 August 1997. He was a regular pick during the 1997–98 and 1998–99 seasons and helped Orient to the 1999 Third Division play-off Final, which was lost 1–0 to Scunthorpe United. Joseph made just one appearance during the 1999–00 season and was released at the end of the campaign, after making 77 appearances across his two spells at Brisbane Road.

Non-League football 
After his release from Leyton Orient, Joseph dropped into non-League football and played for King's Lynn, Leatherhead and had two spells with former club Southall. He had two spells with AFC Wimbledon during the 2003–04 and 2004–05 seasons and though he did not make any competitive appearances, he became one of the first players to play for both Wimbledon and its phoenix club.

International career 
Joseph won two England B caps during the second half of the 1990–91 season, starting in wins over Iceland and Switzerland B.

Personal life 
Joseph is of Dominican descent. His brother Francis and nephew Zak are also footballers. Prior to his return to professional football with Brentford in 1984, Joseph worked as a painter and decorator.

Career statistics

Honours 
 Third Division PFA Team of the Year: 1987–88
 Brentford Players' Player of the Year: 1987–88

References

External links

Roger Joseph at premierleague.com

1965 births
Living people
English footballers
Wimbledon F.C. players
Brentford F.C. players
Millwall F.C. players
Leyton Orient F.C. players
West Bromwich Albion F.C. players
Premier League players
England B international footballers
Southall F.C. players
English Football League players
Association football fullbacks
Black British sportspeople
King's Lynn F.C. players
AFC Wimbledon players
Leatherhead F.C. players
Isthmian League players
Southern Football League players
Chelsea F.C. players
English people of Dominica descent